Stephen Robertson may refer to:

Stephen Robertson (computer scientist), British computer scientist
Stephen Robertson (cricketer) (born 1963), New Zealand cricketer
Stephen Robertson (footballer) (born 1977), Scottish football goalkeeper
Stephen Robertson (politician) (born 1962), Australian politician

See also
Steven Robertson (born 1970), Scottish actor
Steve Robertson (disambiguation)
Robertson Stephens, investment bank